Bulgaria competed at the 2000 Summer Olympics in Sydney, Australia.

Medalists

Athletics

Men
Track & road events

Field events

Women
Track & road events

Field events

Badminton
 
Men's Singles
Svetoslav Stoyanov
 Round of  64 — Bye 
 Round of  32 — Defeated Rio Suryana of Australia
 Round of  16 — Lost to Xia Xuanze of China
Mihail Popov
 Round of  64 — Bye 
 Round of  32 — Lost to Fung Permadi of Chinese Taipei

Men's Doubles
Mihail Popov and Svetoslav Stoyanov
 Round of  32 — Lost to Martin Lundgaard Hansen, Lars Paaske of Denmark

Women's Singles
Nely Boteva
 Round of  64 — Defeated Kellie Lucas of Australia
 Round of  32 — Lost to Chia-Chi Huang of Chinese Taipei

Women's Doubles
Nely Boteva and Diana Koleva
 Round of  32 — Lost to Gao Ling, Qin Yiyuan of China

Boxing

Canoeing

Sprint
Men

Equestrianism

Show jumping

Gymnastics

Judo

Modern Pentathlon

Rowing

Men

Women

Sailing

Only one woman competed for Bulgaria in the Sailing competition at the 2000 Olympics.

Shooting

Men

Women

Swimming
 
Men

Women

Volleyball

Women's Beach Competition

Weightlifting

Men

Women

Wrestling

Men's Greco-Roman

Men's Freestyle

Notes

References

Wallechinsky, David (2004). The Complete Book of the Summer Olympics (Athens 2004 Edition). Toronto, Canada. . 
International Olympic Committee (2001). The Results. Retrieved 12 November 2005.
Sydney Organising Committee for the Olympic Games (2001). Official Report of the XXVII Olympiad Volume 1: Preparing for the Games. Retrieved 20 November 2005.
Sydney Organising Committee for the Olympic Games (2001). Official Report of the XXVII Olympiad Volume 2: Celebrating the Games. Retrieved 20 November 2005.
Sydney Organising Committee for the Olympic Games (2001). The Results. Retrieved 20 November 2005.
International Olympic Committee Web Site
sports-reference

Nations at the 2000 Summer Olympics
2000 Summer Olympics
2000 in Bulgarian sport